Araeosoma alternatum is a species of sea urchin of the family Echinothuriidae. Their armour is covered with spines. It is placed in the genus Araeosoma and lives in the sea. Araeosoma alternatum was first scientifically described in 1934 by Ole Theodor Jensen Mortensen, a Danish zoologist.

See also 
 Arachnoides tenuis
 Araeolampas atlantica
 Araeosoma belli

References 

alternatum
Animals described in 1934
Taxa named by Ole Theodor Jensen Mortensen